Disaster victim identification (DVI) is the process of identifying the remains of people who have died in a mass fatality incident such as a plane crash or bomb blast. The process can be time-consuming to avoid mis-identification. Techniques include fingerprinting, use of dental records and DNA profiling.

See also 
 Body identification
 Disaster Mortuary Operational Response Team
 Emergency management
 FBI Victims Identification Project
 Forensic archaeology
 Unidentified decedent

References 

Forensic anthropology
Disaster management
Unidentified decedents